Sacchettoni  is a type of stuffed pasta also known as "Beggar's Purse".  It consists of small circles or squares of pasta filled like ravioli then fastened at the top like a small bag.

Types of pasta